Iliamna Volcano, or Mount Iliamna (Dena'ina: Ch’naqał’in; Sugpiaq: Puyulek), is a glacier-covered stratovolcano in the largely volcanic Aleutian Range in southwest Alaska. It is the 25th most prominent peak in the United States.

The volcano's glaciers have extensively altered its profile, cutting, deep and creating steep cliffs and cirques. There is no summit crater, only a zone of fumaroles just south of the summit at the top of large collapse zone at the head of Red Glacier, which exposes a cross section of the mountain.

Holocene eruptive activity from Iliamna is little known, but radiocarbon dating seems to indicate at least a few eruptions, all before the European settlement of Alaska. Prehistoric eruptions have been dated to 5050 and 2050 BCE (VEI-4), 450 BCE and 1650. Historically observed eruptions took place in 1867 (VEI-2) and 1876 (VEI-3), with unconfirmed eruptions in 1933, 1947, 1952 and 1953. Fumaroles located at about  elevation on the eastern flank produce nearly constant plumes of steam and minor amounts of sulfurous gases. These plumes are quite vigorous and have resulted in numerous pilot reports and early historical accounts of "eruptions" at Iliamna Volcano. Earthquake swarms and elevated seismicity and gas emissions were reported in 1996-97 and 2011–13. Iliamna was ranked as a high-threat volcano by the U.S. Geological Survey in 2005 and 2018. The 2018 assessment ranked Iliamna as the 20th most hazardous volcano in the United States, up from 22nd, with an aviation threat score of 34 and an overall score of 115, the second highest of the "high threat" category.

Major glaciers radiate from the summit of Iliamna, including Red Glacier, Tuxedni Glacier, Lateral Glacier and Umbrella Glacier.

Iliamna was first ascended in 1959. It was designated a National Natural Landmark in 1976.

See also
Alaska Volcano Observatory
List of mountain peaks of North America
List of mountain peaks of the United States
List of mountain peaks of Alaska
List of Ultras of the United States
List of volcanoes in the United States

References

External links

 Iliamna Volcano at the National Park Service

Volcanoes of Kenai Peninsula Borough, Alaska
Stratovolcanoes of the United States
Volcanoes of Alaska
Lake Clark National Park and Preserve
Aleutian Range
Mountains of Alaska
Mountains of Kenai Peninsula Borough, Alaska
North American 3000 m summits
National Natural Landmarks in Alaska
Holocene stratovolcanoes